Heritage Foundation of Pakistan is a Pakistani heritage and humanitarian aid organization founded by Yasmeen Lari and Suhail Zaheer Lari in 1980.

The organization's mission is "to document and conserve the traditional and historic built environment of Pakistan; create an awareness of Pakistan’s rich and diverse historic architecture and art; and to promote cultural heritage for social integration, peace and development."

Saving cultural heritage buildings
In 1984, when there were plans to demolish the historically significant Hindu Gymkhana, Karachi building because it had somewhat deteriorated due to lack of maintenance, Heritage Foundation Pakistan intervened to save it. After that, the building was designated as a Protected Sindh Cultural Heritage building and is still being used as a facility that houses the National Academy of Performing Arts .

Awards
In 2002, the Heritage Foundation of Pakistan received the Recognition Award from the United Nations System in Pakistan for its commitment to "documentation and conservation of heritage and environment of traditional and historical centers of Pakistan."

References

External links
 Heritage Foundation, Pakistan at Google Cultural Institute

1980 establishments in Pakistan
Heritage organizations
History organisations based in Pakistan